Crocota peletieraria, the pale dyer, is a moth of the family Geometridae. The species was first described by Philogène Auguste Joseph Duponchel in 1830. It is found in France and Spain.

The wingspan is 26–35 mm for males and 22–28 mm for females.

The larvae feed on Trifolium, Taraxacum, Plantago, Rumex, Lotus corniculatus and Achillea species (including Achillea ptarmica).

References

External links
Lepiforum e.V.

Moths described in 1830
Boarmiini
Moths of Europe
Taxa named by Philogène Auguste Joseph Duponchel